Lillian Schlissel (born 22 February 1930) is an American historian, professor and author.

Life and career 

Schlissel was born on 22 February 1930 in New York City. She was raised in New York City. She is currently a professor emerita of English and American studies at Brooklyn College-CUNY.

Bibliography 

Some of her books are:

 Women's Diaries of the Westward Journey 
 Far from Home: Families of the Westward Journey 
 Black Frontiers: A History Of African American Heroes In The Old West 
 Western Women: Their Land, Their Lives

References

External links 
 
 

1930 births
Living people
American women historians
Brooklyn College faculty
City University of New York faculty
21st-century American women